

Johnson Valley is a small unincorporated community in San Bernardino County in Southern California between Victor Valley and Morongo Basin areas of the High Desert region of California. It is north of Highway 247 in the Mojave Desert, and north by northwest of Yucca Valley.  It is bordered by the San Bernardino Mountains to the south, Lucerne Valley to the west, and Landers to the east.

Geographically, Johnson Valley is the eastern portion of Lucerne Valley (referring to the geographical valley formation rather than the unincorporated town), opening up to the Homestead Valley in the southeast to the communities of Flamingo Heights, Landers, and Yucca Valley.

Population 
Defined as a ZCTA (ZIP-Code Tabulation Area, 92285), the combined population of Landers plus Johnson Valley (which share the zip code) is approximately 2,200 residents as of 2013.

Points of interest 
Johnson Valley, famous for the Chemihuevi Native Indian "Willie Boy" incident in 1909, is home to desert areas such as Rock Corral and a number of indigenous petroglyphic sites in the northernmost areas of Chaparral Desert landscapes south of Pisgah Crater. Johnson Valley is bordered by Landers to its south, and is the western gateway to Big Bear Lake, California.

Recreation 
Johnson Valley OHV (Off Highway Vehicle) area is a tract of BLM-managed land set aside for recreational use by residents and off-highway enthusiasts.  The OHV area is bordered by Interstate 40 at its northernmost point, at Highway 247's northern leg to Barstow at its western border, and at Emerson Dry Lake/US Marine Corps Air Ground Combat Center at its easternmost border.  Off-Road Enthusiasts participate in a course known as "The Hammers", a triangular off-road track at Bessemer Mine Road at the southern point of Soggy Lake. King of the Hammers, an off-road desert race, utilizes trails found in "The Hammers". Expansion plans of the US Marine Corps AGCC Base include annexing parts of the OHV area, which may permanently close access to the track.

References

External links
 Official Johnson Valley Website
 Johnson Valley Weather Underground
 Johnson Valley Weather Webcam
 Johnson Valley Off-Highway Vehicle Area - BLM

Populated places in the Mojave Desert
Valleys of the Mojave Desert
Unincorporated communities in San Bernardino County, California
Unincorporated communities in California
Valleys of California
Valleys of San Bernardino County, California